Antonios Katinaris (1931 – 28 October 1999) was a Greek musician. He was born in Chania, Crete, the first son of a refugee family from Asia Minor. Since his earliest years, he demonstrated his interest and his talent in music.  He was already a music professional at the age of 16. His virtuoso bouzouki-playing made him famous on the popular music stages of Chania.

He went to Athens in the 1960s, where he made his big break into the Greek popular musical scene as a composer. The song What can you do, with only one heart, with lyrics by Eftichia Papagianopoulou, marked the start of his national career.

Private life
Katinaris was married to Maria Rippi, herself a singer and member of a famous musicians family. He has three daughters, from which one, Maria Katinari, is continuing his music work as a singer and songwriter.

Discography (not yet complete)
 12 Fylla tis Kardias,, Columbia, 1971
 Palia Merakia, (Παλιά Μεράκια), Columbia, 1973
 Baglamades, (Μπαγλαμάδες), Columbia, 1973
 Asta na pane, (Αστα να Πάνε), Columbia, 1974
 Neotera ki Anotera, (Νεώτερα κι Ανώτερα), Columbia, 1974
 Synanastrofes, (Συναναστροφές), Columbia, 1974
 Aftapates, (Αυταπάτες), Columbia, 1975
 Bouzoukokelaidismata, (Μπουζουκοκελαϊδίσματα ), Polyphone 1978
 Akou ti tha po, (Άκου Τι Θα Πω), Relans, 1982
 12 Epityxies (12 Επιτυχίες), Relans, 1982
 Laiko Palko (Λαϊκό Πάλκο), Polyphone, 1987
 Gia sas ta Dialeksa, (Για σας τα Διάλεξα) WEA, 1994

External links
Official biography - authorized by his daughter Maria Katinari

Greek Rempetiko Music Site
The Song, "Ti na sou kanei mia Kardia"

1931 births
1999 deaths
People from Chania
Greek rebetiko singers
Cretan musicians
Greek songwriters
20th-century Greek male singers